Music Farm may refer to:
 Music Farm (music venue) is a music venue in Charleston, South Carolina which has been open since April 1991.
 Music Farm (label) is a Korean pop record label, founded as a name of 'Farm Entertainment' in 2001.
 Music Farm (Italian TV series) was a musical reality show on Rai 2, led by Simona Ventura from 2004 to 2006.